Diospyros parabuxifolia is a tree in the family Ebenaceae. The specific epithet  is from the Greek meaning "similar to D. buxifolia". D. parabuxifolia is endemic to Borneo and confined to Sarawak.

References

parabuxifolia
Endemic flora of Borneo
Trees of Borneo
Flora of Sarawak
Plants described in 2001